Solomon (or Salomon) II (died 23 December 889) was the Bishop of Constance from 875 until his death. He was a relative of his predecessor and namesake Solomon I and stood in the middle of an "episcopal dynasty." He was commended for his life when the Annales Fuldenses record his death. He was succeeded by his own namesake and another relative, Solomon III.

Sources
The Annals of Fulda. (Manchester Medieval series, Ninth-Century Histories, Volume II.) Reuter, Timothy (trans.) Manchester: Manchester University Press, 1992.

Roman Catholic bishops of Constance
889 deaths
Year of birth unknown